Telocator Alphanumeric Protocol (TAP) is an industry-standard protocol for sending short messages via a land-line modem to a provider of pager and/or SMS services, for onward transmission to pagers and mobile phones.

TAP, initially known as Motorola Page Entry (PET) was adopted in September 1988, by the Personal Communication Industry Association.  TAP defines an industry standard for sending alphanumeric messages to pagers.

TAP was also known as IXO protocol.  Originally, devices like the IXO Device were used to send Alphanumeric Pages using TAP.  Later, Motorola would create a similar device called the AlphaMate.

TAP Communication Protocol 
The standard protocol is ASCII with XON/XOFF flow control, using a 10-bit code (1 start bit, 7 data bits, even parity, 1 stop bit). No echo shall be employed in full duplex mode.

See also 
 Simple Network Paging Protocol (SNPP)
 Wireless Communications Transfer Protocol (WCTP)

References

External links
 Directory of TAP Dialup Numbers from avtech.com
 Directory of TAP Dialup Numbers from notepage.net
 Universal TAP Gateway from tapgateway.com
 http://www.braddye.com/a_entry.html
 http://www.tapgateway.com/files/TAP_V1P8.pdf
 http://www.pageone.co.uk/downloads/developer/TAP_Document.pdf (version 1.7)

Mobile telecommunications standards
Network protocols
Radio paging